Stearyl palmityl tartrate is a derivative of tartaric acid used as an emulsifier. It is produced by esterification of tartaric acid with commercial grade stearyl alcohol, which generally consists of a mixture of the fatty alcohols stearyl and palmityl alcohol. Stearyl palmityl tartrate consists mainly of diesters, with minor amounts of monoester and of unchanged starting materials.

Use 
Stearyl palmityl tartrate is used as emulsifier under the E number E 483. The Food and Agriculture Organization of the United Nations sets limits of use at 4 g/kg for bakery wares and 5 g/kg for dessert products.

Law 
Use of stearyl palmityl tartrate is prohibited in Australia.

References 

Food additives
Tartrate esters
E-number additives